Bee Broadcasting, Inc., also known locally as the "Bee Broadcasting Radio Network", is a regional radio broadcasting company, based in Kalispell, Montana. The stations they operate cover the entire Flathead Valley area of northwestern Montana, including all of Glacier National Park. The company has been in the area for over 25 years.

The broadcast center that houses all the offices and studios is northeast of Kalispell, at 2432 US Highway 2 East. The two AM transmitters are on Monegan Road, on the east side of Whitefish, MT. All five FM stations share a transmitter and tower site north of Whitefish, near The Big Mountain. 

Bee Broadcasting owns and operates seven radio stations, covering a wide variety of formats:

 KJJR AM 880  "The Flathead Valley's Only Full Service News Talk Radio Station"
 KSAM (AM) 1240  "ESPN Sports Radio For The Flathead Valley"
 KHNK FM 95.9 "Outlaw Country"
 KBBZ FM 98.5  "The Flathead's Best Classic Rock"
 KRVO FM 103.1 "The Flathead's New Music Station"
 KWOL-FM 105.1 "Greatest Hits of All Time!"
 KDBR FM 106.3 "Montana Country"

External links
Bee Broadcasting

References

Companies based in Montana
Radio broadcasting companies of the United States